Krum, often referred to as Krum the Fearsome was the Khan of Bulgaria from sometime between 796 and 803 until his death in 814. During his reign the Bulgarian territory doubled in size, spreading from the middle Danube to the Dnieper and from Odrin to the Tatra Mountains. His able and energetic rule brought law and order to Bulgaria and developed the rudiments of state organization.

Biography

Origins
Krum was a Bulgar chieftain from Pannonia. His family background and the surroundings of his accession are unknown. It has been speculated that Krum might have been a descendant of the old Bulgar royal house of Kubrat. The name Krum is of Turkic origin and means "governor prince" (from kurum "rule, leadership, administration").

Establishment of new borders

Around 805, Krum defeated the Avar Khaganate to destroy the remainder of the Avars and to restore Bulgar authority in Ongal again, the traditional Bulgar name for the area north of the Danube across the Carpathians covering Transylvania and along the Danube into eastern Pannonia. This resulted in the establishment of a common border between the Frankish Empire and Bulgaria, which would have important repercussions for the policy of Krum's successors.

Conflict with Nikephoros I
 
Krum engaged in a policy of territorial expansion. In 807 Bulgarian forces defeated the Byzantine army in the Struma valley. In 809 Krum besieged and forced the surrender of Serdica, slaughtering the garrison of 6,000 despite a guarantee of safe conduct. This victory provoked Byzantine Emperor Nikephoros I to settle Anatolian populations along the frontier to protect it and to attempt to retake and refortify Serdica, although this enterprise failed.

In early 811, Nikephoros I undertook a massive expedition against Bulgaria, advancing to Marcellae (near Karnobat). Here Krum attempted to negotiate on 11 July 811, but Nikephoros was determined to continue with his plunder. His army somehow avoided Bulgarian ambushes in the Balkan Mountains and made its way into Moesia. They managed to take over Pliska on 20 July, as only a small, hastily assembled army was in their way. Here Nikephoros helped himself to the treasures of the Bulgarians while setting the city afire and turning his army on the population. A new diplomatic initiative from Krum was rebuffed.

The chronicle of the 12th-century patriarch of the Syrian Jacobites, Michael the Syrian, describes the brutalities and atrocities of Nikephoros: "Nikephoros, emperor of the Byzantine empire, walked into the Bulgarians' land: he was victorious and killed great number of them. He reached their capital, seized it and devastated it. His savagery went to the point that he ordered to bring their small children, got them tied down on earth and made thresh grain stones to smash them."
 
While Nikephoros I and his army pillaged and plundered the Bulgarian capital, Krum mobilized as many soldiers as possible, giving weapons even to peasants and women. This army was assembled in the mountain passes to intercept the Byzantines as they returned to Constantinople. At dawn on 26 July, the Bulgarians managed to trap the retreating Nikephoros in the Varbitsa Pass. The Byzantine army was wiped out in the ensuing battle and Nikephoros was killed, while his son Staurakios was carried to safety by the imperial bodyguard after receiving a paralyzing wound to the neck. It is said that Krum had the Emperor's skull lined with silver and used it as a drinking cup.

Conflict with Michael I Rangabe
Staurakios was forced to abdicate after a brief reign (he died from his wound in 812), and he was succeeded by his brother-in-law Michael I Rangabe. In 812 Krum invaded Byzantine Thrace, taking Develt and scaring the population of nearby fortresses to flee towards Constantinople. From this position of strength, Krum offered a return to the peace treaty of 716. Unwilling to compromise from a position of weakness, the new Emperor Michael I refused to accept the proposal, ostensibly opposing the clause for exchange of deserters. To apply more pressure on the Emperor, Krum besieged and captured Mesembria (Nesebar) in the autumn of 812.
 
In February 813 the Bulgarians raided Thrace but were repelled by the Emperor's forces. Encouraged by this success, Michael I summoned troops from the entire Byzantine Empire and headed north, hoping for a decisive victory. Krum led his army south towards Adrianople and pitched camp near Versinikia. Michael I lined up his army against the Bulgarians, but neither side initiated an attack for two weeks. Finally, on 22 June 813, the Byzantines attacked but were immediately turned to flight. With Krum's cavalry in pursuit, the rout of Michael I was complete, and Krum advanced on Constantinople. On the way, most of the fortresses, hearing about the strength of the Bulgarian army, surrendered without a fight. Only Adrianople resisted. The siege of this city was led by Krum's brother, who continued the advance towards the Byzantine capital. In front of the walls of the Byzantine capital, the ruler performed impressive pagan sacrifices of people and animals. This made a great impression on the inhabitants of Constantinople and was even described by Theophanes the Confessor and in the Scriptor incertus (an anonymous Byzantine short chronicle describing the events of the period 811 – 820). In addition, Krum orders a moat with a rampart to be dug from the Blacharnae to the Golden Gate. Thus, the capital is surrounded on the land side. These actions of the Bulgarian ruler are more a demonstration of strength than serious intentions to capture the city. The aim was to force the Byzantine rulers to conclude a peace with which they would recognize the conquests of the Bulgarians.

The discredited Michael was forced to abdicate and become a monk—the third Byzantine Emperor forced to give up the throne by Krum in as many years.

Conflict with Leo V the Armenian 
The new emperor started the peace negotiations, with a secret idea that during the negotiations Krum will be killed. The requirements for a meeting between the two camps is that both sides are small in number and unarmed. For this reason, Kavhan Iratais and Krum's son-in-law Konstantin Pacik (who was most likely used as a translator) were present with Krum. In contrast, Leo V the Armenian did not attend in person. Already at the beginning of the meeting, the Bulgarian ruler noticed the signs that the Romans were making to the soldiers waiting in ambush, and although he was wounded, he managed to escape. Kavkhan was killed, and Konstantin Patsik together with his son (Krum's nephew) were captured. Enraged by the baseness of the Romans, Krum ordered the looting and burning of churches and monasteries in Eastern Thrace . His wrath culminated in the capture of Adrianople and the capture of 10,000 soldiers defending the city (including the parents of the future Emperor Basil I). Although Krum realized the defensive capabilities of the Byzantine capital, ordered a massive preparations for the attack on Constantinople to began, which included Slavs , Avars and special siege equipment ("turtles", battle towers, "rams", flamethrowers, etc.). Worried by all these preparations, the emperor began to strengthen the city walls and defenses. But this grandiose plan of the Bulgarian ruler was not implemented. On April 13, 814 , Krum died, most likely of a hemorrhage and stroke.

Legacy

Krum was remembered for instituting the first known written Bulgarian law code, which ensured subsidies to beggars and state protection to all poor Bulgarians. Drinking, slander, and robbery were severely punished. Through his laws he became known as a strict but just ruler, bringing Slavs and Bulgars into a centralized state.

Novels have been written on his life, such as by Dmityar Mantov (1973) and Ivan Bogdanov (1990).

See also

History of Bulgaria
Bulgars

Annotations

References

Sources
 
 
  (primary source)

  (primary source)
 Theophanes the Confessor, Chronicle, Ed. Carl de Boor, Leipzig.
 .

External links
 Khan Krum Featured on Bulgarian Commemorative Coin
 Nikolov, A. Khan Krum in the Byzantine tradition: terrible rumours, misinformation and political propaganda. – In: Studies in honour of Professor Vassil Gjuzelev (= Bulgaria Mediaevalis, 2). Sofia, 2011, 39-47

Monarchs of the Bulgars
8th-century births
814 deaths
9th-century Bulgarian monarchs
Year of birth unknown
Bulgarian people of the Byzantine–Bulgarian Wars
Turkic rulers